The National Basketball League Kiwi MVP was an annual National Basketball League (NBL) award given to the best performing New Zealand player(s) of the regular season. With no MVP award given for the league's first two seasons, in 1984, the league named its first MVP in New Zealander John "Dutchie" Rademakers. The award then went on a six-year hiatus before being brought back in 1991. However, the league did not recognise imports, with only New Zealanders being able to win MVP honours. That was until 2003 when a league-wide MVP award was introduced alongside the Kiwi MVP to allow imports the opportunity to win. In 2019, the Kiwi MVP was not awarded for the first time since 1990.

Winners

See also
 List of National Basketball League (New Zealand) awards

References

Awards established in 1984
mvp
Basketball most valuable player awards
M